Bus conductors (also referred to as conductors, or clippies) were a common feature of many bus services across Europe until the late 1970s and early 1980s. The main reason two-person crews were needed was that most towns and cities used double-decker buses for urban services. Until the 1960s, all double deck vehicles were built with front-mounted engines and a "half-cab" design, such as the familiar AEC Routemaster London bus. This layout totally separated the driver from the passenger saloons. The conductor communicated with the driver using a series of bell codes, such as two bells to start (the well-known "ding-ding").

Many half-cab double-deckers were boarded from an open platform at the rear, while others were equipped with a forward entrance and staircase and driver-operated doors. Each case required a conductor to collect fares and, especially on the rear-entrance design, supervise passenger loading and unloading. Some bus services in the late 1960s and early 1970s experimented with later-model forward entrance half-cab double-deckers—removing the conductor and having the driver sell tickets, as on the rear entrance buses that were common by that time. The hope was to have the benefits of one-person operation without the cost of replacing vehicles that still remaining service life. This idea was soon scrapped and the buses reverted to conventional conductor operation.

Demise
In the late-1950s, new double-decker bus designs appeared that provided higher capacity, with the engine compartment at the rear and the entrance door by the driver. From July 1966, UK transport regulations were changed to allow operation of urban double-deck buses by the driver only, who could now collect fares and supervise all passenger loading and unloading.

Some municipal operators adopted rear-engine bus designs and "one-person operation" quickly, others more slowly. More conservative municipal operators continued to order new half-cab buses through the 1960s, but this type of vehicle ceased production in the UK by about 1970. This was accelerated by a UK Government grant that supported the purchase of "one person operated" vehicles, but was not available for purchase of traditional half-cab buses.

Through the 1970s, the proportion of urban bus routes operated with conductors declined, as older vehicles were steadily replaced with new buses equipped for one-person operation, and operators grappled with staff shortages, rapidly increasing costs and falling usage. Hull Corporation Transport, an early pioneer in one-man-operation, became the first municipal bus company in Britain to phase out conductors in 1972.

Modern usage

China
Bus conductors are still existing on some articulated buses in Beijing, such as route 1, 2, 5, 300, 347. However, these bus conductors do not take responsibilities to sell tickets, their duties are mostly supervising on-boarding passengers of fare collection like inserting note and coins, or card swiping.

Britain and Ireland

By the early 1980s, bus conductors were largely obsolete in all cities except London and Dublin. Two-person crews continued to operate a number of bus routes in central London until late 2005, well beyond their demise in the rest of the country. This reprieve for conductors was due to continued use of the famous Routemaster bus.

In May 1987, following the start-up of Solent Blue Line, conductor buses returned to Southampton, where services were run in competition against Southampton Citybus on speeding up journey times, using second-hand Bristol VRTs. In retaliation, Southampton Citybus brought in ex-London Routemasters with a crew of conductors, these arrangements lasting until autumn 1989.

The Routemaster was purpose-built for London conditions and remained well suited to the busiest routes in the most congested parts of central London. This was because of its maneuverability, fast passenger loading/unloading capability, and fare collection by the conductor instead of the driver. The Routemaster construction was of high quality, the design robust, and mechanical and body parts could be easily rebuilt and refurbished. Importantly, the "traditional red bus" is also a unique tourism icon for London, instantly recognisable around the world.

Though the majority of bus services in the London metropolis (and all routes outside the central area) have been operated by modern driver-only vehicles since the late 1980s, twenty regular routes retained Routemasters and their conductors. Between 2003 and 2005, all of these were progressively converted to low-floor modern vehicles and one-person operation. The process was largely driven by political views on disability accessibility and was encouraged, to some extent, by the increase in litigious passengers claiming injuries due to the Routemaster's open rear platform. There were also increasingly frequent robberies and attacks on conductors, who could find themselves working in an isolated and vulnerable environment. The last regular Routemaster-operated service was on route 159 from Marble Arch to Streatham. Conductor operation finally ceased on the 159 on 9 December 2005. However, heritage bus routes utilising the Routemaster were introduced that year, these numbered route 9H and 15H. Route 9H was withdrawn in 2014, whilst route 15H was withdrawn at the end of the 2019 season, after having been reduced to summer weekends only.

In the late 2000s and early 2010s, there was a revival in conductor operation on buses in the UK with the development of the FTR routes in York, Leeds and Swansea. As of 2020 however, these have all been withdrawn.

Conductors also returned to London in 2012 with the introduction of the New Routemaster. Some of the routes served by the New Routemaster did not have conductors, so the service were driver-only operated, in which the driver controlled the three doors of the bus. The role of the conductor was to ensure passengers validated their Oyster card as they board the bus and supervised passengers using the open platform. These have since all been removed and buses now run one-person operation with the open platform closed out of use.

Stagecoach Strathtay used conductors on Tayway service 73 from Arbroath, Carnoustie and Monifieth to Ninewells Hospital. In September 2020, however, Stagecoach announced their intention to withdraw their final conductors from this service resulting in 31 redundancies. The operator attributes this to the COVID-19 pandemic and its resultant drive towards contactless payment.

Quantock Motor Services in Somerset operates the service 400 'Exmoor Explorer' using crew-operated vintage open-top buses.

India, Pakistan, Bangladesh, Qatar, and Sri Lanka 
In India, Pakistan, Bangladesh, Qatar, and Sri Lanka bus conductors are almost always present inside the buses throughout the journey. Government bus conductors may communicate with the driver via a bell, whistle, or by shouting, "right!" (Aa right in south India). Private bus conductors use whistles or just shout to the driver. It is also common practice for conductors to clap their hand firmly on the outside of the bus as a signal to the driver that all passengers have boarded and the bus is good to go.
Indian actor superstar Rajinikanth began acting in plays while working in the Bangalore Transport Service as a bus conductor.

Mauritius 
Buses in Mauritius are operated with both a driver and a conductor. The bus conductor's job is mainly to collect money and hand out travel tickets to the passengers.

References

Bus terminology
Transport occupations